Gabriel Mälesskircher, or Mäleßkircher (c. 1425/30 – c. 1495) was a German painter; active in Southern Bavaria. He was a representative of the "Second Munich School of Painting".

Life and work 
Part of his apprenticeship period may have been spent in the Netherlands. He is documented as having been in Munich after 1461. He served several terms as the head of the Guild of St. Luke (painter's guild) and became a member of the city council in 1469. He was elected the Zweiter Bürgermeister (assistant mayor) in 1485. The Mäleßkircherstraße in the Daglfing district of Munich is named after him.

Much of his work was done on behalf of Tegernsee Abbey, because around 1450 he married Anna Ayrenschmalz, the sister of its Abbott, Konrad Ayrenschmalz (died 1492). Thirteen altarpieces created for the abbey (now in various museums) are considered to be his most important works. This includes scenes from the lives of the Four Evangelists, now at the Museo Thyssen-Bornemisza in Madrid. His workshop was very productive and, at one time, included Michael Wolgemut, of Nuremberg, who would become the teacher of Albrecht Dürer.

In 1470, documents indicate that he received a major commission from Sigismund, Duke of Bavaria, which is believed to have been for work at Fürstenfeld Abbey. Much of his major work from 1474 to 1479 may be seen in the Galerie Schloss Schleißheim, the Bayerische Nationalmuseum and the Alte Pinakothek.

He died in Munich during an outbreak of the plague. After his death, the workshop passed to his son, Caspar, who had been operating it since about 1485, when his father's health began to decline.

Scenes from the Lives of the Evangelists (1478)

References

Further reading 
 Hans Dollinger: Die Münchner Straßennamen. Südwest Verlag, München 2007, pg. 197
 Herbert Schindler: Große bayerische Kunstgeschichte. Vol. 1. Süddeutscher Verlag, München 1963, pgs. 298, 301
 Sophia Springer: Die Tegernseer Altäre des Gabriel Mälesskircher., München 1995,

External links 

Biography @ the Museo Thyssen-Bornemisza
Staatsgalerie Burghausen, Veitsaltar aus Tegernsee

15th-century births
1490s deaths
Year of birth uncertain
Year of death uncertain
Religious art
15th-century German painters
Artists from Munich